Eduardo Schwank defeated Nicolás Massú 6–2, 6–2 in the final.

Seeds

Draw

Finals

Top half

Bottom half

References
 Main Draw
 Qualifying Draw

Copa Petrobras Santiago
2009 Singles